The 2000 S.League was the fifth season of the S-League, the top professional football league in Singapore. It was won by Singapore Armed Forces, their third league title.

Teams
S.League had been expanding with addition of new clubs for every season since its beginnings, the 2000 season was the first season without any new club addition. All clubs were playing at the designated home stadiums which lead to building their identities within their local communities.

Foreign players
Each club is allowed to have up to a maximum of 4 foreign players.

League table

Top scorer

References

Singapore Premier League seasons
1
Sing
Sing